The Luckiest Man in the World is the ninth studio album recorded by American country music artist Neal McCoy. It was scheduled to be released in January 2003 on Warner Bros. Records, but was never released. The album's only single, which was the title track, peaked at #46 on the Billboard country charts in 2002. "Put Your Best Dress On" was later released by Steve Holy in 2004, whose version went to #26 on the same chart.

Although it was not released, Robert L. Doerschuk of Allmusic reviewed the album. He gave it four stars, saying that McCoy "fills this album with quality material and digs into it with some of his finest singing to date."

Track listing
"Sing" (Brett James, Angelo Petraglia) – 3:55
"The Luckiest Man in the World" (Monty Powell, Eric Silver) – 3:48
"All at the Same Time" (Jim Collins, D. Vincent Williams) – 3:44
"Elvis at the Airport" (Leslie Satcher) – 2:50
"Put Your Best Dress On" (Billy Austin, Dillon Dixon, Don Pfrimmer, Williams) – 3:08
"Mine Is You" (James, Frank Rogers) – 3:22
"Never Got to Say" (Dean Blocker, Noah Gordon, Phil O'Donnell) – 3:47
"Honky Tonk Mona Lisa" (Marcus Hummon, Darrell Scott) – 3:13
"Too Far Gone" (Robert Ellis Orrall, John Bettis, Michael Post) – 3:35
"I'm Your Biggest Fan" (Anthony Smith, Bobby Terry, Chris Wallin) – 4:57

Personnel
David Angell - violin
Jeff Bailey - trumpet
Bob Britt - electric guitar
John Catchings - cello
Lisa Cochran - background vocals
David Davidson - violin
Scott Dixon - electric guitar
Mark Douthit - saxophone
Sonny Garrish - pedal steel guitar
Mike Haynes - trumpet
Wes Hightower - background vocals
Mark Hill - bass guitar
Wayne Killius - drums, percussion
Troy Lancaster - electric guitar
Tim Lauer - keyboards
Lynn Massey - drums, background vocals
Neal McCoy - lead vocals
Chris McDonald - trombone
Chris McHugh - drums, percussion
Lorne O'Neil - bass guitar, background vocals
Ryan Pierce - fiddle, background vocals
Jeffrey Roach - organ, piano
Louis Rodriguez - acoustic guitar
Matt Rollings - organ, piano
Leslie Satcher - background vocals
Steve Segler - keyboards, background vocals
Joey Shamp - background vocals
Eric Silver - fiddle, acoustic guitar, mandocello, mandolin
Jimmie Lee Sloas - bass guitar
Keith Urban - electric guitar
Kristin Wilkinson - viola
Chris Willis - background vocals

References

2003 albums
Neal McCoy albums
Warner Records albums
Unreleased albums